The 1960 New Zealand Grand Prix was a motor race held at the Ardmore Circuit on 9 January 1960.

Classification

References

New Zealand Grand Prix
Grand Prix
January 1960 sports events in New Zealand